Hébert or Hebert may refer to:

People

Surname
 Anne Hébert, Canadian author and poet
 Ashley Hebert, subject of The Bachelorette (season 7)
 Bobby Hebert, National Football League player
 Chantal Hébert, Canadian political commentator
 Chris Hebert, American actor
 Corey Hébert, American celebrity physician and entrepreneur
 David Hebert, musicologist and musician
 Edmond Hébert, French geologist
 Ernest Hébert, French painter
 Felix Hebert, United States Senator from Rhode Island
 Felix Edward Hébert, member of the United States House of Representatives from Louisiana
 Gabriel Hebert SSM (1866-1963), Anglican theologian
 Georges Hébert, a French physical education practitioner, theorist and instructor
 Guy Hebert, National Hockey League player
 Jacques Hébert, French Revolution figure
 Jacques Hébert (Canadian politician)
 Jay Hebert, American golfer
 Jean Hébert (born 1957), Canadian chess player and writer
 Jean-Pierre Hébert, American artist
 Kyle Hebert, American voice actor
 Kyries Hebert, American football player
 Lionel Hebert, American golfer
 Louis Hébert, early Quebec farmer
 Marie Marguerite Françoise Hébert, French wife of revolutionary leader
 Paul D.N. Hebert, Canadian biologist
 Paul M. Hebert, judge at the Nuremberg Tribunals
 Paul Octave Hebert, governor of Louisiana
 Pierre-Eugène-Emile Hébert, French sculptor
 Sammy Hebert, Canadian hockey player
 Thomas-Joachim Hébert, French marchand-mercier

Nickname
Hebert Silva Santos, a Brazilian professional footballer

Place-names 
Containing Hébert- or -hébert:

Canada
Hébert Lake, a lake of Eeyou Istchee James Bay (municipality), in Jamésie, in Nord-du-Québec, in Quebec.
Hébert River, a tributary of Doda Lake, flowing into Eeyou Istchee James Bay (municipality), in Jamésie, in Nord-du-Québec, Quebec, Canada.
Hébertville, Quebec municipality, Saguenay–Lac-Saint-Jean.

France
 Thuit-Hébert (Tui Herbert in 1216), French commune in Eure (département), region Normandy.
 Le Petit-Hébert (Thuit Hebert in 1727), hamlet at Foulbec, Eure department.
 Pont-Hébert (#Pons Heberti in 1260), French commune in Manche (département), region Normandy.
 Saint-Martin-le-Hébert (#Beati Martini le Hebert in 1250), French commune in Manche ;
 Le Plessis-Hébert (Plaiseis Herbert in 1190), French commune in Eure.
 Héberville (#Herbervilla in 1155), French commune in Seine-Maritime, region Normandy.
 Place Hébert, square in Paris (France).
Latinized form #

External links 
Number of birth with the surname Hébert, concentrated in Normandy (départements n°76, 50, 14, 27) and Paris before 1915

See also

 Hebert Arboretum, Massachusetts
 Hebert Road, St. Albert, Alberta
 Paul M. Hebert Law Center, part of the Louisiana State University
 Herbert

Surnames
Surnames of Norman origin